The Smolenka is a minor river in the city of Saint Petersburg, Russia. It is one of the armlets of the Neva forming its delta.

The river takes its name from the Smolensky Cemetery. There are four bridges across the Smolenka:
 Uralsky Bridge
 Smolensky Bridge
 Nalichny Bridge
 Shipbuilders' Bridge

Rivers of Saint Petersburg
Distributaries of the Neva